The Kelter Range is a range of mountains in far North-eastern Russia. Administratively the range is part of the Sakha Republic, Russian Federation.

The area of the range is uninhabited, the nearest settlement is Segyan-Kyuyol, Kobyaysky District.

Geography 
The Kelter Range is one of the subranges of the Verkhoyansk Range system and is located in its southwestern section. It stretches roughly from northwest to southeast to the north of the Munni Range, running in an arch in a parallel direction to it. The western end is bound by the valley of the Tagyndzha, a tributary of the Belyanka, and the eastern by the valley of the Eyeges (Эйэгес), a tributary of the Kele.

River Tumara cuts across the range in its central part and its right tributary Nuora flows below the northeastern slopes of the range. River Lyapiske has its sources at the western end of the range.

See also
List of mountains and hills of Russia

References

External links
Pictures of the area
Fishing in Russia
Verkhoyansk Range

ceb:Kel'terskiy Khrebet
sah:Кэлтэр